In the 1939–40 season, USM Alger is competing in the First Division for the 3rd season French colonial era, as well as the Forconi Cup. They will be competing in First Division, Coupe de la Ligue, and the Coupe de la Solidarité.

Competitions

Overview

Championnat

League table

Group A

Matches

Coupe de la Ligue

Coupe de la Solidarité

Squad information

Playing statistics
Statistics for eight games only and six games does Its figures.

Goalscorers
Includes all competitive matches. The list is sorted alphabetically by surname when total goals are equal.

References

External links
 L'Echo d'Alger : journal républicain du matin

USM Alger seasons
Algerian football clubs 1939–40 season